The Pasadena Museum of California Art (PMCA) was an art museum located in Pasadena, California, United States, showcasing art and design originating from California.  The museum was founded by long-time Pasadena residents and art collectors Robert and Arlene Oltman. Ground was broken in 2000 and the museum officially opened in June 2002.

The museum did not house a permanent collection, but instead featured changing exhibits. Notable exhibitions included Maynard Dixon: Masterpieces from the Brigham Young University and Private Collections, the largest exhibition of Dixon's art to date; Wayne Thiebaud: 70 Years of Painting, a retrospective survey; Data + Art: Science and Art in the Age of Information, organized in conjunction with the Jet Propulsion Laboratory, and a mid-career retrospective of painter Mark Ryden.  The museum hosted the California Design Biennial.

The museum closed in October 2018.

References

External links
Museum home page
Pasadena Museum of California Art at Google Cultural Institute

Museums in Pasadena, California
Art museums and galleries in California
Museums of American art
Art in Greater Los Angeles
Art museums established in 2002
2002 establishments in California
2018 disestablishments in California
Defunct museums in California